Aeroport Sheremetyevo is a railway station in Sheremetyevo Airport which is served by Aeroexpress. It was opened on 10 June 2008.

Gallery

References

Railway stations in Moscow
Railway stations of Moscow Railway